Christopher "Chris" Howarth (born 25 December 1960) is a British former competitive figure skater. He is the 1981 British national champion and competed at the 1980 Winter Olympics in Lake Placid, New York, where he placed 15th.

Howarth is a commentator for British Eurosport, as well as a skating coach and assistant general manager at the Glacier Ice Arena, in Vernon Hills, Illinois. He has also worked for the Dutch Figure Skating Association.

Results

References

British male single skaters
Figure skaters at the 1980 Winter Olympics
Olympic figure skaters of Great Britain
Figure skating commentators
1960 births
Living people
People from Vernon Hills, Illinois